Oscar Salathiel Kambona (1925-1997) was the first Minister of Foreign Affairs of Tanganyika. He was arguably the second-most influential and most popular leader in the country after President Julius Nyerere. 

Kambona was born on 13 August 15 on the shores of Lake Nyasa in a small village called Kwambe near Mbamba Bay in the district of Nyasa near Songea in Ruvuma region southern Tanganyika. He died in London in November 1997.

He was the son of the Reverend David Kambona and Miriam Kambona. Reverend David Kambona belonged to the first group of African priests to be ordained into the Anglican Church of Tanganyika.

Kambona received his primary school education at home under a mango tree in his home village. The tree still stands today. He was taught by his parents and by an uncle, all of whom were teachers.

He was then sent to St. Barnabas Middle School in Liuli in southern Tanganyika not far from his home. He also attended Alliance Secondary School in Dodoma in central Tanganyika.

A British Anglican bishop paid Oscar Kambona's school fees because his father could not afford to do so. The school fees were 30 Pounds per year. Kambona is reported to have said he convinced the Anglican bishop to pay his school fees by reciting the Lord's Prayer in English.

He was then selected to attend Tabora Boys’ Senior Government School where he first met Julius Nyerere who was already teaching at St. Mary's, a Catholic school in the town of Tabora.

Political career

Kambona became the secretary-general of the Tanganyika African National Union (TANU) during the struggle for independence and worked closely with Nyerere who was president of TANU, the party that led Tanganyika to independence. Tanganyika secured independence from Britain on 9 December 1961. The two were the most prominent leaders of the independence movement in Tanganyika in the 1950s and close friends. When Kambona married a former Miss Tanganyika at a cathedral in London, Nyerere was his best man.

Oscar Kambona proved to be a charismatic leader who also had great influence among the leaders of the African liberation movements based in Dar es Salaam, Tanzania, second only to Nyerere. It was widely believed that he would be the next President of Tanzania if Nyerere no longer ran for office or stepped down. 

His stature as Nyerere's heir apparent or successor was enhanced when, as Minister of Defence, he calmed down soldiers who could have overthrown the government during an army mutiny in January 1964. President Nyerere and Vice President Rashidi Kawawa were taken to a safe place by the  members of the intelligence service in case the soldiers wanted to harm them. Kambona confronted the soldiers and negotiated with them. He drove himself to the army barracks to talk to the army mutineers and listen to their demands. The soldiers wanted their salaries increased and British army officers replaced by African officers. Kambona, leveraging his popularity with the Tanganyikan soldiers, agreed to most of their demands and sent them back to the barracks. Kambona persuaded Nyerere to seek immediate assistance from Britain should further mutinies arise.

Soldiers in neighbouring Kenya and Uganda also mutinied around the same time, within the next two days after Tanganyika's army mutiny, and made the same demands their counterparts did in Tanganyika. The army mutinies in the three African Great Lakes countries were suppressed by British troops who had been flown from Aden and Britain at the request of the nations' three respective leaders (Julius Nyerere of Tanganyika, Jomo Kenyatta of Kenya, and Milton Obote of Uganda). Other British troops came from neighbouring Kenya. The mutinies were over in only a few days. After Nyerere came out of seclusion, he publicly thanked Oscar Kambona, whom he called "my colleague," for defusing a potentially dangerous situation.

The close political alliance between Kambona and Nyerere began to fracture in 1965, when Tanzania officially became a one-party. As a cabinet member, Oscar Kambona reluctantly supported the transition to a one-party state although he was personally opposed to the change on the grounds that there were no constitutional safeguards to prevent the emergence of a dictatorship. Chief Abdallah Said Fundikira III, a long-time friend of Nyerere, had left Tanganyika not long after independence over similar disagreements.

In February 1967, Tanzania adopted the Arusha Declaration, an economic and political blueprint for the transformation of Tanzania into a socialist state. Kambona was opposed to this fundamental change and argued that the government should first launch a pilot scheme to see if the policy was going to work on a national scale.

Tanzania's socialist policy was mainly based on the establishment of ujamaa villages, roughly equivalent to communes or the Kibbutz in Israel, so that the people could live and work together for their collective well-being and make it easier for the government to provide them with basic services such as water supply, medical treatment at clinics, and education by building schools which could be within short distance from the villages.

Oscar Kambona argued that it was important, first, to show the people that living in ujamaa villages, or collective communities, was beneficial and a good idea. He said that could be done by establishing a few ujamaa villages in different parts of the country as a pilot scheme to demonstrate the viability of those villages and show the people the benefits they would get if they agreed to live together and work together on communal farms.

The debate, conducted mostly in private when the delegates of the ruling party TANU were discussing in a public forum the document of the Arusha Declaration, was between Oscar Kambona on one side and Julius Nyerere and Rashid Kawawa on the other side. The private meeting and debate went on for quite some time during the duration of the conference and whenever the subject came up, whether or not Tanzania should adopt socialist policies and establish ujamaa villages, Kawawa regularly aligned with Nyerere against Kambona. Kambona denounced Kawawa as a puppet of Nyerere. Kawawa personally claims that "had no disagreement with Kambona and worked well with him as a colleague throughout" following Kambona's death. 

But the differences between Kambona and Nyerere were fundamentally ideological and more than just a dispute over the way ujamaa villages should be established. Kambona was in favour of capitalism, though he had read about Karl Marx, and opposed to Chinese influence in Tanzania, pointing out that it was after Nyerere's first trip to the People's Republic of China that Nyerere decided to establish a one-party state.

Exile

A few months later, in July 1967, Oscar Kambona left Tanzania with his wife and children and went into "self-imposed" exile in London.

It was first reported that he sneaked out of the country and drove all the way to Nairobi, Kenya, a neighboring country. But it is highly unlikely that the members of the Tanzania's intelligence service were not aware of his departure. The government simply let him go. They could have stopped him, and could even have arrested him, if they wanted to.

After he left and when his departure was reported in Tanzania's newspapers and on the radio, President Nyerere himself at a public rally in Dar es Salaam, the capital, talked about Kambona and said "Let him go." He also said Kambona left with a lot of money and wondered how he got all that money which did not match his salary.

There were rumors that one of the ways he enriched himself when he was in office was by taking some of the money which was intended to go to the liberation movements based in Tanzania.

During that period he was also chairman of the Organization of African Unity (OAU) Liberation Committee overseeing liberation movements based in Dar es Salaam, Tanzania, in addition to his ministerial position as minister of external affairs.

The allegations that he misappropriated some of the funds intended for the liberation struggle in Southern Africa, and got more money from other sources illegally or by unscrupulous means, were repeated on 12 January 1968, when President Nyerere challenged Oscar Kambona to return to Tanzania and testify before a judicial commission that he had not deposited large sums of money in his account, and explain where he got it from since it far exceeded his salary.

Kambona responded to the allegations by requesting the Tanzanian government in a press conference in London in 1968 to hold a public investigation into his personal wealth and publish the findings. The government did not do that.

It is also highly unlikely that Kambona misappropriated wealth since he spent most of his life in exile living in subsidized council housing for poor income families.

Tony Laurence, in his book The Dar Mutiny of 1964 published by Book Guild Publishing states that, fearing for his life, Kambona went to live in exile in Great Britain with no financial support and took a number of low-paying jobs to support himself and his family. Yet, during all that time, Kambona conducted himself with dignity, and with a sense of humour in spite of the hardship, and was a friend of other people who were also living in exile. Some of them were in a better financial position than he was.

Nyerere's challenge to Kambona, asking him to account for his money, was widely reported in Tanzanian newspapers and by Radio Tanzania Dar es Salaam (RTD) during that time. It has also been documented by Jacqueline Audrey Kalley in her voluminous work, Southern African Political History: A Chronology of Key Political Events from Independence to Mid-1997.

There was also disagreement with respect to the manner in which Kambona's exile was described. Reports in Tanzania said he went into "self-imposed" exile but, to Kambona and his supporters as well as other observers, he had been forced to leave Tanzania because he had fallen out with Nyerere and did not feel that he would be safe or lead a normal life within a hostile political climate.

Speculation that he may have been in imminent danger just before he left, was somewhat confirmed when his house in Magomeni, Dar es Salaam, was destroyed by the security forces and the soldiers of the Tanzania People's Defense Forces (TPDF) although not demolished. The destruction is shown in a photograph on the web site of the Kambona Foundation.

The destruction of his house, after Kambona left, seemed to have been some kind of warning or simply a scare tactic and it probably achieved its purpose, especially with regard to Kambona's supporters in Tanzania. It probably meant, "this is what we have in store for you," or "this is what you are going to get," if you continue to support Kambona. And "this is what would have happened to him had he stayed."

That may be just one of the interpretations as to why his house was destroyed. There may be other interpretations of the government's motives for sanctioning its destruction.

But fear for his security and freedom was real, further confirmed when his two younger brothers, Mattiya Kambona and Otini Kambona, were arrested around the same time he fled to London. They were detained for many years until they were eventually released by President Nyerere.

From his sanctuary in London, Oscar Kambona became a bitter critic and opponent of President Nyerere and his policies.  He was even invited by the Nigerian military government of General Yakubu Gowon in June 1968 to go and lecture in Nigeria, after Tanzania recognised The State of Biafra (the first African country to do so in April, 1968), thus infuriating Nigerian leaders for supporting the secession of the Eastern Region of the Nigerian Federation.

During his lecture tour of Nigeria in June 1968, Kambona denounced Nyerere as a dictator and accused the Tanzanian government of supplying weapons to Biafra.

In a lecture in Lagos on 14 June 1968, he also said weapons and ammunition sent to Tanzania for the Zimbabwe African People's Union (ZAPU) freedom fighters had been diverted by Nyerere and sent to Biafra; and went on to say that Tanzania's recognition of Biafra as a sovereign nation had damaged the country's reputation in Africa and elsewhere.

Tanzania stated that it had recognised Biafra for moral reasons because of the refusal and unwillingness of the local and the federal authorities to stop the massacre of Igbos and other Easterners in Northern Nigeria and other parts of the country, but especially in the North.

Nigerian leaders were also quick to remind Nyerere that it was Nigerian troops who had saved him and provided security and defence for Tanganyika after the army mutiny in Tanganyika in 1964 when Nyerere appealed to fellow Africans for troops to temporarily provide defence while the Tanganyikan government was building a new army. Nigeria, under the leadership of President Nnamdi Azikiwe and Prime Minister Tafawa Balewa, immediately responded to Nyerere's request.

Kambona was also quick to remind his listeners in Nigeria, and even in Britain where he had lived, that it was he who calmed down the soldiers when they mutinied while President Nyerere and Vice President Kawawa went into hiding, "in a grass hut," as he put it.

Coup Leader

Not long after Kambona got ample publicity during his lecture tour of Nigeria in 1968 denouncing Nyerere, he was again in the news in Tanzania and other African countries and elsewhere. He was accused of masterminding a coup attempt to overthrow Nyerere1.

The coup was to take place in October 1969. But all the alleged conspirators were arrested before the fateful date, except Kambona who was living in London.

The alleged plotters were charged with treason. The chief witness for the prosecution was Potlako Leballo, president of the Pan-Africanist Congress (PAC), a South African liberation group based in Dar es Salaam, Tanzania. Leballo took over the leadership of the organization after its first president, Mangaliso Roberto Sobukwe, were imprisoned by the apartheid regime.

Leballo had gained the confidence of the coup plotters while he was working for Tanzania's intelligence service. His testimony proved critical in securing a conviction of the accused during the treason trial presided over by Chief Justice Phillip Telfer Georges, a Trinidadian. The leading government attorney, besides Attorney-General Mark Bomani, was Nathaniel King, also from Trinidad.

Kambona was the first accused and was charged in absentia.

There were reports that he would be extradited to Tanzania but he never was. The Tanzanian government did not seek his extradition. It is also highly unlikely that the British government would have sent him back to Tanzania even if the two countries had an extradition treaty.

And since he did not appear in court during the treason trial, he was not convicted. He could not have been convicted in a fair trial without himself being there to defend himself.

During the trial, prosecuting attorney, Nathaniel King, said the coup plotters also intended to assassinate President Nyerere. He asked one of the accused, John Lifa Chipaka, what he meant when he said - in their secret communications obtained by the Tanzania intelligence service - they were going "to eliminate" Nyerere. Chipaka responded by saying, "Eliminate him politically, not physically."

Chief Justice Phillip Telfer Georges asked him the same question and was not convinced that Chipaka was telling the truth.

Also the Chief Justice said the list of names found on the younger brother of John Chipaka, Eliya Dunstan Chipaka who was a captain, was not the kind of list one would expect to be a list of guests invited to a wedding. It was a list of army officers, potential participants in the planned coup, who were going to be approached or had already been approached by the conspirators to see if they could take part in the plot to overthrow the government. The list included officers from both sides of the union: Tanzania mainland and Zanzibar.

The Chipaka brothers were cousins of Oscar Kambona.

The court proceedings were reported in the newspapers and on the radio and they were open to the public. The records of those proceedings can be obtained from different sources, including newspapers from that period, and many documented works. They quote what the accused, the prosecuting attorneys, and the chief justice said during the trial.

The transcript of the court proceedings, reported in Tanzanian newspapers and elsewhere, is also reproduced in Godfrey Mwakikagile, Nyerere and Africa: End of an Era.

While his co-conspirators were languishing in prison after being convicted of treason, Oscar Kambona continued to criticize Nyerere from his safe haven in London through the years, while nurturing ambitions to return into the political arena in his home country where he once was a bright star in the 1960s before he fled to London.

Return of the "prodigal son"

It was not until 1992 after Tanzania adopted multiparty democracy that Kambona returned to lead one of the opposition parties after 25 years living in exile. He was the most prominent figure on the opposition side during that time after he returned to his home country.

And he was in a combative mood. Even before he left London, he challenged the Tanzanian government to arrest him on his arrival in Tanzania, vowing that he was returning to Tanzania regardless of consequences and to clear his name before the people of Tanzania. He was not arrested.

But that was not the end of his ordeal.

The beginning of the end

A campaign by the government was started to vilify him again. First was the claim that he was not a citizen of Tanzania and had never been one even though he had served as the country's Minister of Home Affairs, Minister of Defence, and Minister of Foreign Affairs, and even led the struggle for independence with Nyerere in the 1950s.

Yet nothing was said in all those years about him not being a citizen of Tanganyika. It was only decades later, in the 1990s, that the government said he was not a Tanzanian but a Malawian. Others said he was a Mozambican.

The government even withdrew his passport on the same grounds that he was not a Tanzanian citizen. He could not even travel outside the country after his passport was withdrawn.

The vilification campaign against him by the Tanzanian government eventually began to have a negative impact on the government's own image and it eventually relented and gave Mr. Kambona's passport back to him.

Kambona himself had his own "revelations" concerning the national identities of other Tanzanian leaders including President Nyerere himself. He said Nyerere's father was a Tutsi from Rwanda who was a porter for the Germans and settled in Tanganyika and that he could prove it.

He also said Vice President Rashid Kawawa came from Mozambique, and John Malecela - who once served as Tanzania's Foreign Affairs Minister, Prime Minister and Vice President among other posts at different times - came from Congo where his grandparents were captured as slaves before they settled in Dodoma, central Tanzania.

But few people took any of those claims seriously any more than they did the claim that Kambona himself was not a Tanzanian citizen but a Malawian, from Likoma Island, or a Mozambican.

When Kambona returned to Tanzania, he also promised that he would tell the public how much money President Nyerere and Vice President Kawawa had stolen through the years and where they hid it.

Many people were anxious to hear that. But when he addressed a mass rally in Dar es Salaam, he had nothing to say about the money he claimed President Nyerere and Vice president Kawawa stole. And many people were disappointed. It also cost him credibility among many people who believed that he simply did not tell the truth and had nothing to say about Nyerere and Kawawa with regard to their "misappropriation" of public funds.

End of his life

Kambona was indeed a luminary in Tanzanian politics. But he was no longer the star he once was, when he was second only to Nyerere in influence and popularity in the sixties when many people even copied his clothing and hair style, which came to be known as "Kambona style."

He died in London in July 1997, almost exactly 30 years after he first went into exile in Britain in July 1967 where he lived for 25 years before returning to his home country in 1992 to spend the last few years of his life.

Despite his political misfortunes, Oscar Kambona will always be remembered as one of the most prominent leaders of Tanzania who also played a leading role in the struggle for independence and who relentlessly campaigned for the adoption of multiparty democracy in Tanzania. But he will also always be remembered as the most prominent Tanzanian leader who tried to overthrow President Julius Nyerere.

It is, of course, anybody's guess how he would have been, as a leader, had he become president of Tanzania. Even his most bitter opponents can not prove he would have been a bad leader. He could have been one of the best presidents Tanzania ever had. We will never know. Or to put it another way, Oscar Kambona was one of the best presidents Tanzania never had.

And it is very much possible that under his leadership, Tanzania's economy would probably not have suffered as much as it did under Nyerere during his years of socialist rule. Socialism ruined Tanzania's economy and Kambona was opposed to socialism right from the beginning, although many Tanzanians believed that Nyerere meant well but pursued the wrong policies.

Even Kambona himself probably believed that Nyerere meant well but pursued the wrong policies and that the country would have done better had Nyerere and his colleagues been willing to listen to those who had different views on how the country should be run.

Today, Tanzania is pursuing free-market policies after renouncing socialism, and has adopted multiparty democracy, the same policies and kind of political system Kambona had advocated all along.

He has probably been vindicated by history.

References

Godfrey Mwakikagile, chapter 13, "Coup Attempts Against President Julius Nyerere and Reflections on Coup Leader Oscar Kambona by Andrew Nyerere," in his book Nyerere and Africa: End of an Era, 2nd Edition (Las Vegas, Nevada: Protea Publishing Co., 2005), pp. 359 – 377.

The book  covers extensively the 1970 treason trial  in which Oscar Kambona was implicated as the ring leader. The trial was open to the public.

The author has also addressed the army mutiny of 1964 in Tanganyika among many other subjects.
Godfrey Mwakikagile: Eurocentric Africanist? https://sites.google.com/site/intercontinentalbookcentre/godfrey-mwakikagile-a-eurocentric-pan-africanist

Jacqueline Audrey Kalley, Southern African Political History: A Chronology of Key Political Events from Independence to Mid-1997 (Greenwood Press, 1999), p. 594, where she says President Julius Nyerere challenged Oscar Kambona to return to Tanzania and testify before a judicial commission that he had not deposited large sums of money in his account.
"Bibi Titi and the Treason Trial of 1970," in The East African, Nairobi, Kenya, 10–16 November 1999.
Adam Seftel and Annie Smyth, editors, Tanzania: The Story of Julius Nyerere, Mkuki na Nyota Publishers, Dar es Salaam, Tanzania, and Fountain Publishers, Kampala, Uganda.
Kambona Foundation, Dar es Salaam, Tanzania.

Kambona and Nyerere remained political enemies until the end of their lives. When Kambona died in July 1997, Nyerere did not even attend his funeral. But his son Andrew Nyerere did, as he stated in his correspondence with Godfrey Mwakikagile, quoted in Mwakikagile's book, Nyerere and Africa: End of an Era. See Andrew Nyerere's letter in chapter 13 of the book, p. 365.

1928 births
1997 deaths
Tanganyika African National Union politicians
Foreign ministers of Tanzania
Tabora Boys Secondary School alumni